Hewitt-Trussville High School (HTHS) is a four-year public high school in the city of Trussville, Alabama. It is the only high school in Trussville City Schools and is named for the early local educator Robert Hewitt. School colors are red and gray, and the athletic teams are called the Huskies. HTHS competes in Alabama High School Athletic Association Class 7A athletics.

Recognition 
HTHS has been recognized by a variety of sources as one of the best high schools in Alabama:
 SchoolDigger ranks HTHS 8th out of 351 high schools in the state of Alabama and 4th among high schools in the Birmingham area.
 HTHS is one of 12 Alabama schools included in the Washington Post's 2016 list of America's Most Challenging High Schools.
 Newsweek includes HTHS among the 20 Alabama schools selected for its list of America's Best High Schools.
 US News & World Report ranks HTHS 13th among Alabama high schools and classifies it as a silver medal school. 
 HTHS was named a National Blue Ribbon School by the U.S. Department of Education, the highest recognition a school can receive from the department in 1992 and 2020.

Student profile 
Enrollment in grades 9-12 for the 2020-2021 School Year was logged at 1,548 students. Approximately 75% of students are white, 20% are African-American, 2% are Asian-American, 1% are Hispanic, and 1% are multiracial. Roughly 12% of students qualify for free or reduced price lunch.

HTHS has a graduation rate of 97%, and 75% of students attend a four-year college or university upon graduation. Approximately 95% of students meet or exceed proficiency standards in both reading and mathematics. The average ACT score for HTHS students is 27 and the average SAT composite is 1280.

Curriculum 
Approximately 52% of students take one or more of the following Advanced Placement courses:

Students can also take advantage of six different career-focused academies:
 Academy of Business & Finance, which includes dual enrollment in UAB courses and a paid internship
 Biomedical Sciences Academy, based on the nationally recognized Project Lead the Way curriculum
 Electrical Construction Academy, leading to both NCCER and OSHA certifications
 Engineering Academy
 Hospitality & Culinary Arts Academy
 Information Technology Academy, leading to the Microsoft Office Specialist or Adobe Certified Associate credential

History 

Before HTHS was organized under a school district, its roots stretch back to 1869 to the first schoolhouse in Trussville, named the Trussville Academy. Founded by academic Robert Greene Hewitt, this schoolhouse served as a church and school building until the property was sold to the city while the school moved to a property across from the future Chalkville Road school. By the 1920s there was sufficient demand for a high school in the local rural communities that Jefferson County Schools created a new school zone for the communities of Trussville, Clay, Chalkville, Ayres (now part of Clay), Pinson, Center Point, Palmerdale (now part of Pinson), and Roper (now part of Trussville).

Named in honor of the founder of the first schoolhouse in Trussville, a new school was established and named R.G. Hewitt High School. The new school was established in 1925 on Chalkville Road and graduated its first students in 1927. By 1938 the student population had outgrown the facility, leading Jefferson County Schools to request that a community center under construction in the Cahaba Homestead Village be used as a high school instead. This building, located at 301 Parkway Drive, would serve as Trussville's high school until a new high school campus was constructed on Trussville-Clay Road. This was also the year the name of the high school changed to Hewitt-Trussville High School, which has remained the same to this day.

During the 1940s-1960s HTHS remained a rural county school with most students coming in from surrounding communities. From the 1960s-1970s the HTHS school zone was gradually reduced with the introduction of high schools and new school zones in Center Point and Pinson/Palmerdale, due to population growth in those communities which began overcrowding the Trussville schools. By the early 1980s HTHS was still dealing with overcrowding, classes then moved to the new Trussville-Clay Road campus in January 1984, at which point the 1938 facility was renovated to house Hewitt-Trussville Middle School.

The new HTHS campus was designed by Adams/Peacher/Keeton/Cosby, Inc. with Moore Engineering & Construction serving as the general contractor. In 1996 the large, illuminated signage visible from I-59 was added to the southern facade. The front wing contained the gymnasium, auditorium, cafeteria, band room and administrative offices. The rear wing contained academic classrooms with the five hallways being distinguished by color (the red, orange, green, yellow & gray). The interior featured a pair of outdoor courtyards.

During the late 1980s and early 1990s, HTHS struggled to accommodate a rapidly growing student population from the Trussville, Clay, and Chalkville areas. By 1995, HTHS enrolled over 1,500 students in only three grades and was the sixth largest high school in the state of Alabama. The Jefferson County Board of Education agreed to build a new high school that would serve students from Clay and Chalkville, reducing the HTHS student population by about 40%. Although overcrowding was temporary resolved with the construction of Clay-Chalkville High School in 1996, the continued rapid growth within Trussville resulted in the need for a new building, which opened in October 2008. The existing school was then converted into Hewitt-Trussville Middle School, which now occupies the building.

The current HTHS building is located on a 127-acre site on Husky Parkway between Trussville-Clay Road and Deerfoot Parkway, across I-59 from the previous campus.  The school is able to accommodate about 1,600 students with room to grow to 2,400 students in the future. The school also includes a fine arts center, auditorium, field house and multiple athletic fields.

The final design for the school was approved by the Trussville Board of Education in September 2006. On Tuesday, November 14, 2006, the Trussville City Council rezoned the parcels at 5601 and 5555 Trussville-Clay Road from agricultural to institutional use to allow for the construction of the new building. The school was designed by Davis Architects and encompasses 360,000-square feet. Its design includes white columns and a clock tower, and at a final cost of $70 million, the school was the most expensive high school ever built in Alabama upon its opening in October 2008. However, more funding was required after a failed attempt to build an indoor swimming pool on the 2nd floor B-Wing.

Athletics

List of competitive athletic teams 
HTHS competes in  AHSAA Class 7A athletics and fields teams in the following sports:

Facilities 
Jack Wood Stadium, adjacent to the building at 301 Parkway Drive, was used until 2013 for football games and track and field events, as well as annual commencement exercises. In 2014 a new stadium was opened on Husky Parkway, and Jack Wood stadium was demolished as part of the construction of Cahaba Elementary School. Current facilities include the Bryant Bank Arena (HTHS gymnasium), Phil English Field (baseball stadium), Goldie Paine Field (softball stadium), Hewitt-Trussville soccer stadium, and Hewitt-Trussville Stadium which houses Husky Field as well as the Dobbs’ Cross Country and Track & Field Complex.

Championships 
HTHS has won seventeen AHSAA state championships:

 Baseball (2016)  
 Boys’ Indoor Track (2021)
 Girls’ Bowling (1975, 1977)
 Girls’ Flag Football (2021)
 Girls' Golf (2005)
 Girls' Indoor Track (1999, 2021)
 Girls' Outdoor Track & Field (1999) 
 Gymnastics (discontinued) (1989, 1990, 1991)
 Softball (2019, 2021)
 Wrestling (1983, 1987, 1988) 

HTHS football has won six regional championships (1983, 1992, 1993, 1995, 2008, 2016, and 2017). It has competed in the state football playoffs thirty-two times, reaching the semifinals three times and finals once. HTHS had its first undefeated season in 2016, and repeated it in 2017. Noted for being a football power under coaches Jack Wood, Hal Riddle, and more recently Josh Floyd, it has fought off former rivals such as Leeds High School, Center Point High School (formerly E. B. Erwin High), and its most famous former rival, Clay-Chalkville High School. HTHS continues to play longtime rivals Pinson Valley High School and Huffman High School while battling newer rivals Hoover High School and Thompson High School.

HTHS has an outstanding Girls' Basketball team, coming in as runner up in 2019 and 2021, and consistently producing great teams under coach Tonya Hunter.

Introduced in 2021, HTHS Girls' Flag Football had an undefeated inaugural season under coaches Taylor Burt and Tonya Hunter, winning the first ever Girls’ Flag Football state championship.

Student activities 
HTHS sponsors a variety of student activities, including many nationally affiliated clubs and organizations. The following is a list of many of these:

Notable alumni
 Jay Barker, former quarterback for University of Alabama and NFL player with  Green Bay Packers, New England Patriots, and Carolina Panthers
 Brandon Cox, former quarterback for Auburn University
 Whaley Hall, former NFL player
 Noah Igbinoghene, NFL player with  Miami Dolphins
 Brent Key, head football coach, Georgia Tech
 Irene Latham, author of poetry and fiction for young adults
 Victor McCay, artist and actor known for roles in Argo, The Ring Two, and Enough
Malachi Moore, football player
 Mike Mordecai, former baseball player with Atlanta Braves, Montreal Expos, and Florida Marlins
 Dave Reavis, football player with Tampa Bay Buccaneers
 Jason Standridge, baseball player with Tampa Bay Rays and Fukuoka SoftBank Hawks (Japan)
 Justin Tubbs, former point guard for University of Alabama and East Tennessee State University basketball team

References

External links 
 
 HTHS profile on Niche.com
 HTHS Athletics Facebook page
 HTHS Athletics Twitter
 HTHS Husky Football official website
 HTHS football history from ahsfhs.org website

Public high schools in Alabama
Schools in Jefferson County, Alabama
Educational institutions established in 1925
1925 establishments in Alabama